Ukobu is a village in Onicha Agu is a village in Nkanu East local government area of Enugu State in the south eastern region of Nigeria.  The population, originally fishermen and farmers, is approximately 5,000 people.

The soil is well drained during its rainy seasons.

References

Populated places in Enugu State